Mantas Šernius (born June 29, 1983) is currently basketball assistant coach of Prometey of the Latvian-Estonian Basketball League and EuroCup. Šernius is also the Head coach of the Lithuania women's national basketball team.

References

1983 births
Living people
Association football forwards
Lithuanian basketball coaches
Lithuanian footballers
People from Šilutė
FK Atlantas players
FK Inkaras Kaunas players
FK Šilutė players